Camilla Feeley (born November 14, 1999) is an American individual and Olympic group rhythmic gymnast. She won a total of four medals at the 2019 Pan American Games held in Lima, Peru.

In 2016, she won two gold medals and three silver medals at the Pacific Rim Gymnastics Championships held in Everett, United States. At the 2018 Pacific Rim Gymnastics Championships in Medellín, Colombia, she won the gold medal in the team event as well as the gold medal in all five senior individual events.

Feeley was selected to represent the United States at the 2020 Summer Olympics alongside Isabelle Connor, Lili Mizuno, Nicole Sladkov, and Elizaveta Pletneva. They finished eleventh in the qualification round for the group all-around.

References

External links 
 
 
 

Living people
1999 births
Place of birth missing (living people)
American rhythmic gymnasts
Pan American Games medalists in gymnastics
Pan American Games gold medalists for the United States
Pan American Games silver medalists for the United States
Pan American Games bronze medalists for the United States
Gymnasts at the 2019 Pan American Games
Medalists at the 2019 Pan American Games
Gymnasts at the 2020 Summer Olympics
Olympic gymnasts of the United States
21st-century American women